Wang Xiqin (born June 1968) is a Chinese academic administrator who serves the current president of Tsinghua University since February 2022.

Biography
Wang was born in Jiangyan District, Taizhou, Jiangsu province in 1968. He secondary studied at Jiangyan High School.

Wang Xiqin received a Bachelor of Engineering and a Doctor of Engineering both in electronic engineering and from Tsinghua University in 1991 and 1996, respectively.

Wang joined the Chinese Communist Party (CCP) in November 1990. After graduation, he stayed at the university and worked successively as deputy director and director of Electronic Engineering Department, vice dean of the School of Information Science and Technology, director of Personnel Department and director of Human Resources Development Office, and deputy director of Supervision Committee. He became assistant president in February 2016. In December 2016, he was appointed vice president. After this office was terminated in October 2018, he became executive vice president. On 25 February 2022, he was promoted to be president, a position at vice-ministerial level.

References

1968 births
Living people
People from Taizhou, Jiangsu
Tsinghua University alumni
Academic staff of Tsinghua University
Presidents of Tsinghua University